Radovesnice I is a municipality and village in Kolín District in the Central Bohemian Region of the Czech Republic. It has about 400 inhabitants.

The Roman numeral in the name serves to distinguish it from the nearby municipality of the same name, Radovesnice II.

References

Villages in Kolín District